is a multinational corporation headquartered in Japan that specializes in industrial products centered on technologies in organic synthetic chemistry, polymer chemistry, and biochemistry.

Its founding business areas were fibers and textiles, as well as plastics and chemicals.  The company has also diversified into areas such as pharmaceuticals, biotechnology and R&D, medical products, reverse osmosis big membranes, electronics, IT-products, housing and engineering, as well as advanced composite materials.

The company is listed on the first section of Tokyo Stock Exchange and is a constituent of the TOPIX 100 and Nikkei 225 stock market indices.

History
Toray Industries had been originally established as Toyo Rayon in 1926 by Mitsui Bussan, one of the two largest Japanese trading companies (sogo shosha) of the time (the other being Mitsubishi Shoji). The fact that Mitsui did not allow the company to be named as a Mitsui company indicates their skepticism of the risk on the business. Risk arose from the fact that, when it was established, the company did not have the right technology to produce Rayon. It had approached Courtaulds and then Du Pont to buy the technology but, because the price was too high, it decided to buy equipment from a German engineering company and hire about twenty foreign engineers to start the operation.

When Nylon was invented in 1935 by Wallace Carothers of DuPont, Toray immediately got hold of a sample product through the New York City branch of Mitsui Bussan, and started research by dissolving this sample in sulfuric acid. Because of the patent protection, the company had to make its own effort to synthesize polyamide and make fibre out of it. In 1941, just three years after Du Pont's announcement of nylon, Toray completed the basic research on nylon and started building a small plant to produce Nylon 6. The operation started in 1943 and the product was sold, mainly to make fishing nets.

In 1946, following the end of World War II, Du Pont requested an investigation by GHQ (the General Headquarters of Allied Powers) of Toray's infringement of Du Pont's nylon patents but GHQ found no evidence of infringement, certifying that Toray's nylon technology was its own.

Toray is currently the world's largest producer of carbon fiber, and Japan's largest producer of synthetic fiber. Its carbon fiber is extensively used in exterior components of the Boeing 787 airliner.

In 2014, as a major aerospace composites supplier, Toray opened a polyacrylonitrile (PAN), the carbon fiber precursor, production line in Lacq, south-western France.

Operations
 The world headquarters is in the Nihonbashi Mitsui Tower, 1-1, Nihonbashi-Muromachi 2-chome, Chūō, Tokyo, Japan
 Toray sponsors the Pan Pacific Open Tennis Tournament
 Toray sponsors the Digital Creation Awards, in its 10th year in 2005
 Toray has operations in 20 countries and regions: Japan, China, Hong Kong, Taiwan, South Korea, Indonesia, Malaysia (Penfibre SDN Berhad), Singapore, Thailand, India, Czech Republic, France, Germany, Italy, Netherlands, Switzerland, United Kingdom, Mexico, and the United States

In 2013, Toray acquired an approximately 13% stake in Spectral Diagnostics, a Canadian pharmaceutical company focused on sepsis.

In March 2018, Toray announced it would acquire TenCate Advanced Composites to advance carbon fiber production capabilities.

Gallery

See also

 Composite material
 Textile manufacturing
 Alcantara (material)
 Mitsubishi X-2

References

External links
 
List of products
Entrant sports fabrics
Toray See popular glass-cleaning cloth for eyewear or stemware
Pan Pacific Open Tennis Tournament

 
Chemical companies based in Tokyo
Textile companies of Japan
Defense companies of Japan
Manufacturing companies based in Tokyo
Companies based in Osaka Prefecture
Mitsui
Companies listed on the Tokyo Stock Exchange
Companies listed on the Osaka Exchange
Companies formerly listed on the London Stock Exchange
Chemical companies established in 1926
Conglomerate companies based in Tokyo
Japanese companies established in 1926
Eyewear companies of Japan
Japanese brands